Metalloles are metallacycle derivatives of cyclopentadiene in which the carbon atom at position 5, the saturated carbon, is replaced by a heteroatom. In contrast to its parent compound, the numbering of the metallole starts at the heteroatom. Some of these compounds are described as organometallic compounds, but in the list below quite a number of metalloids are present too. Many metalloles are fluorescent.  Polymeric derivatives of pyrrole and thiophene are of interest in molecular electronics.
Metalloles, which can also be viewed as structural analogs of pyrrole, include:

 Arsole, a moderately-aromatic arsenic analog
 Bismole, a bismuth analog
 Borole, a boron analog
 Furan (oxole), an oxygen analog
 Gallole, a gallium analog
 Germole, a germanium analog
 Phosphole, a phosphorus analog
 Pyrrole (azole), a nitrogen analog
 Selenophene, a selenium analog
 Silole, a silicon analog
 Stannole, a tin analog
 Stibole, an antimony analog
 Tellurophene, a tellurium analog
Plumbole, a lead analog
 Thiophene, a sulfur analog
 Titanole, a titanium analog
 Zirconole, a zirconium analog

See also 
Metallacyclopentanes

References